Stephen Greene (born December 8, 1949) is a Canadian politician and an independent member of the Senate of Canada. He was appointed on the advice of Stephen Harper to the Senate on January 2, 2009, and sat as a Conservative Senator until May 2017, when Senate Leader Larry Smith removed him for his support for Senate reform proposals put forth by the governing Liberal Party. Greene then decided to sit as an "Independent Reform" Senator.

Early life and career 
Greene was born in Montreal, Quebec.

Greene served as Chief of Staff in the office of Reform Party of Canada leader Preston Manning for four years. He encouraged future Prime Minister Stephen Harper to run for the leadership of the Reform party's successor party, the Canadian Alliance.

He was an unsuccessful Reform Party candidate in Halifax in the 1993 and 1997 federal elections. He then worked as the Executive Director of the Insurance Brokers Association of Nova Scotia. In the two years prior to his Senate appointment Greene was Principal Secretary and Deputy Chief of Staff to Nova Scotia Premier Rodney MacDonald.

Senate 
Greene joined the Senate on January 2, 2009, after being appointed by Prime Minister Stephen Harper. In an interview with The Chronicle Herald after the appointment had been announced in 2008, Greene indicated that he wished to work on reforming the Senate.

He served as Deputy Government Whip in the Senate from 2010 until June 2011, when he became the Vice Chair of the Standing Senate Committee on Transport. In September 2011, Greene argued that if term limits were added for Senators, the mandatory retirement age of 75 should be removed, citing the case of Senator Vim Kochhar, who worked 14 hours days despite hitting the mandatory retirement age after only two years. In June 2012, the Senate Transport committee on which he was deputy chair issued "The Future of Canadian Air Travel: Toll Booth or Spark Plug?", a report which called on the government to stop requiring Canadian airports to pay rent, which was making them uncompetitive for Canadian flyers compared to American airports south of the border.

In December 2012, Greene, along with Senators Mike Duffy from Prince Edward Island and John D. Wallace from New Brunswick, promoted the idea of Maritime Union, a proposal which would require amending the Constitution of Canada. In a speech to the Halifax West Conservative Riding Association, Greene argued that Maritime Union would reduce the inefficiencies in having multiple provincial governments and bureaucracies for a population one seventh the size of Ontario. Greene also argued that despite the similarities and shared history of the Maritimes, the "artificial" provincial barriers inhibit growth by competing for private sector money and imposing trade barriers on each other.

On September 13, 2013, Greene left his position as Vice Chair of the Standing Senate Committee on Transport and became Deputy Government Whip again.

In July 2015, Greene co-authored a report with Liberal Quebec Senator Paul Massicotte which argued that the Senate's "institutionalized partisanship" should end. After the 2015 federal election, Greene became the only Conservative to sponsor a government bill during the 42nd Canadian Parliament. sponsoring Bill S-4, which implemented double taxation deals with Taiwan and Israel, which was functionally similar to a bill Greene said he had sponsored during the Harper government.

In 2016, Greene endorsed Maxime Bernier in the 2017 Conservative Party of Canada leadership election, and as of May 2017, was the Nova Scotia chair of his leadership campaign. Greene became Deputy Opposition Whip in the Senate on March 7, 2016. In February 2017, Greene proposed an amendment to Bill S-2, a government bill on vehicle safety which would require automobile manufacturers to compensate dealers for unsold vehicles subject to recall. It was supported and incorporated into the Bill by a majority of the Senate.

In March 2017, Greene unsuccessfully ran to succeed Claude Carignan as leader of the Senate Conservatives, losing to Larry Smith. A few days after his defeat, Greene was no longer the Deputy Opposition Whip.

In May 2017, Smith told Greene that if he wished to remain in the Senate Conservatives, he could not accept a dinner invitation from Prime Minister Justin Trudeau thanking all Senators who had sponsored government legislation. According to Smith, Greene's votes at the Senate Modernization Committee in support of plans by Peter Harder, the Liberal government representative in the Senate, were too far out of line for a Conservative Senator because the reform would "effectively eliminate the Opposition." According to Greene, he had offered to report to Smith about the government's plans for the Senate, but was rebuffed. Greene chose to leave caucus and sit as an "Independent Reform" Senator.

Greene joined the Independent Senators Group on October 24, 2017 and left the Conservative Party of Canada. On November 4, 2019, he joined the Canadian Senators Group.

Electoral record

References

External links 
 

1949 births
Living people
Anglophone Quebec people
Businesspeople from Montreal
Canadian senators from Nova Scotia
Conservative Party of Canada senators
Independent Canadian senators
Canadian Senators Group
Nova Scotia candidates for Member of Parliament
Politicians from Montreal
Reform Party of Canada candidates in the 1993 Canadian federal election
Reform Party of Canada candidates in the 1997 Canadian federal election
Reform Party of Canada senators
21st-century Canadian politicians